List of Iran's parliament representatives (10th term) or "List of the representatives of Iran's Islamic Consultative Assembly (10th term)", includes a list which mentions all 290 members of the Majlis of Iran (i.e. Islamic Consultative Assembly) plus the names of the constituencies, provinces, and their political factions. The Legislative elections were held in Islamic Republic of Iran on 26 February and 29 April 2016; four years after the 9th legislature of the Islamic Republic of Iran. The list is as follows:

See also 
 List of Iran's parliament representatives (11th term)
 List of Iran's parliament representatives (9th term)
 List of Iran's parliament representatives (8th term)

 List of Iran's parliament representatives (7th term)
 List of Iran's parliament representatives (6th term)

References 

Islamic Consultative Assembly elections
Islamic Consultative Assembly